Beitstad is a former municipality in what was Nord-Trøndelag county, Norway.  The  municipality existed from 1838 until its dissolution in 1964.  The municipality encompassed what is now the northeastern part of the municipality of Steinkjer in Trøndelag county.  Beitstad was originally quite large, but by 1964, it included the areas east of the Beitstadsundet and Hjellbotn bay and north of the inner-most parts of the Trondheimsfjorden.  The administrative centre was the village of Beitstad where Beitstad Church is located.

History

The parish of Bedstaden was established as a municipality on 1 January 1838 (see formannskapsdistrikt). In 1846, the neighboring municipality of Nummedalseidet to the north was merged with Bedstaden. The spelling was later changed to Beitstad. On 1 January 1904, the northern district of Nummedalseidet (population: 1,368) was separated from Beitstad to create the new municipality of Namdalseid (again, this was the same area that joined Beitstad in 1846). The split left Beitstad with 2,946 inhabitants. On 1 July 1913 another split took place. All of Beitstad located west of the Beitstadsundet strait and Hjellbotn bay (population: 993) was established as the separate municipality of Malm, leaving Beitstad with a population of 1,934. 

During the 1960s, there were many municipal mergers across Norway due to the work of the Schei Committee. On 1 January 1964, a large merger took place: the neighboring municipalities of Beitstad (population: 2,563), Egge (population: 3,476), Kvam (population: 1,245), Ogndal (population: 2,678), Sparbu (population: 4,027), and Stod (population: 1,268) were all merged with the town of Steinkjer (population: 4,325) to form the new municipality of Steinkjer.

Name
The municipality (originally the parish) is named after the local Beitstadfjorden. Historically, the name was spelled Bedstaden or Beitstaden.

Government
While it existed, this municipality was responsible for primary education (through 10th grade), outpatient health services, senior citizen services, unemployment, social services, zoning, economic development, and municipal roads. During its existence, this municipality was governed by a municipal council of elected representatives, which in turn elected a mayor.

Municipal council
The municipal council  of Beitstad was made up of representatives that were elected to four year terms.  The party breakdown of the final municipal council was as follows:

Mayors
During the 125-year history of Beitstad municipality, there were a total of 14 men who served as mayor.

 1838-1841: Jakob Velde 
 1842–1845: Henrik Foosnæs
 1846–1853: Jakob Velde
 1854–1855: Morten Elden
 1856–1859: Ole S. Welde
 1860–1867: Jakob Velde
 1868–1873: Ole S. Welde
 1874–1877: Morten Elden
 1878–1879: Christoffer Hjelde
 1880–1910: Hans Konrad Foosnæs
 1911–1913: Odin Kvam 
 1914–1916: Hans Konrad Foosnæs
 1917–1919: Odin Kvam 
 1920–1925: Edvard Stamnæs 
 1926–1928: Kristoffer Brækken
 1929–1934: Edvard Stamnæs 
 1935–1940: Henrik Bartnes 
 1941-1941: Anton Welde
 1945-1946: Anton Welde
 1947–1947: Odin Rostad
 1948–1951: Einar Kvam
 1952–1955: Odin Rostad
 1956–1958: Einar Kvam 
 1959–1963: Knut Aas

See also
List of former municipalities of Norway

References

Steinkjer
Former municipalities of Norway
1838 establishments in Norway
1964 disestablishments in Norway